"Kapit Lang" is a song recorded by Filipino girl group BINI, released on September 10, 2021, as the second single for their debut album Born to Win. It was written and composed by Lian Kyla along with BINI's Maraiah Queen Arceta; arranged, mixed and mastered by Theo Mortel; administered by Jonathan Manalo at The Purple Room; who has worked also with the BGYO's "He's Into Her".

The official track debuted at number 5 on Spotify's New Music Friday Philippines and at number 3 on iTunes Philippines, since its release.

Composition and lyrics
"Kapit Lang" runs for a total of two minutes and fifty seconds, set in common time with a tempo of 130 beats per minute and written in the key of C♯/D♭ major. Most of its lyrics were written in Filipino, except with the rap parts as it was written in English that speaks about rising above hardship and believing in yourself.

Background and release
The official track of "Kapit Lang" was released on 10 September 2021 accompanied by its music video.

Promotion

Television
On 12 September 2021, "Kapit Lang" debuted on television through ASAP Natin 'To.

Music video
The music video for "Kapit Lang" was produced by YouMeUs MNL, directed by Amiel Kirby Balagtas and written by Edgar Dale Reciña, who also worked with the group's music video of Born to Win. It was presented in a visually bright and lively pastel colors interspersed with different vacation spots, accompanied by slick dance choreography.

References

External links
 

Bini (group) songs
2021 songs
Star Music singles
Taglish songs